Michael L. Marin is an American vascular surgeon. Together with Drs. Frank Veith, Juan C. Parodi and Claudio J. Schonholz, he was the first in the United States to perform minimally invasive aortic aneurysm surgery (stent-graft procedure). In 2004, he was the first doctor to implant an intravascular telemetric monitor -- a device that alerts to physicians any leakage in aortic stent-grafts.

Biography

Education 
Marin attended medical school at Mt. Sinai Medical School in New York. Marin's internship and residency were at Columbia-Presbyterian Medical Center in New York City, and his fellowship in vascular surgery was at Montefiore Medical Center/Albert Einstein College of Medicine. Marin joined the staff of Icahn School of Medicine at Mount Sinai in 1996, the same year he became a Fellow of the American College of Surgeons.

Career 
In 1997, he co-founded the Teramed Corporation, which concentrated on the development and manufacturing of aortic stent graft devices. In 1999 he was appointed the Henry Kaufman Professor of Surgery. As of 2020, Marin is chief of the Division of Vascular Surgery In 2001, he was named the chief of vascular surgery at Mount Sinai Hospital. In December 2003, Dr. Marin became surgeon-in-chief and chairman of the Department of Surgery at Icahn School of Medicine. In 2007, he became the Julius H. Jacobson II, MD, Professor of Vascular Surgery. As of 2020, Marin is the co-inventor on 12 patents.

He also helped create Mount Sinai's Kyabirwa Surgical Facility, an ambulatory surgery center in Kyabirwa, a rural village in Uganda. Marin is interested in awake surgery, where the patient remains awake during the operation and only local anesthesia is used rather than general anaesthesia.

Patents 

 Method and apparatus concerning bypass grafts, Patent number: 6575994, Assignee: Teramed, Inc.
 Method for endoluminally excluding an aortic aneurysm, Patent number: 6168610, Assignee: Endovascular Systems, Inc.
 Method and apparatus for deploying non-circular stents and graftstent complexes, Patent number: 6039749, Assignee: Endovascular Systems, Inc.
 Device for delivering and deploying intraluminal devices, Patent number: 5697948, Assignee: Endovascular Systems, Inc.
 Method and apparatus for forming an endoluminal bifurcated graft, Patent number: 5695517, Assignee: Endovascular Systems, Inc.
 Apparatus and method for deployment of radially expandable stents by a mechanical linkage, Patent number: 5618300, Assignee: Endovascular Systems, Inc.
 Method for deployment of radially expandable stents, Patent number: 5591196, Assignee: Endovascular Systems, Inc.
 Method for delivering and deploying intraluminal devices, Patent number: 5569296, Assignee: Stentco, Inc.
 Method and apparatus for forming an endoluminal bifurcated graft, Patent number: 5507769, Assignee: Stentco, Inc.
 Device for delivering and deploying intraluminal devices, Patent number: 5456694, Assignee: Stentco, Inc.
 Apparatus and method for deployment of radially expandable stents by a mechanical linkage, Patent number: 5443477, Assignee: Stentco, Inc.
 Intraluminal stent, Patent number: 5397355, Assignee: Stentco, Inc.

Publications
Marin authored over 60 chapters and has been published in over 180 peer-reviewed medical journals and one book, Endovascular Grafting Techniques. Many articles focus on intimal hyperplasia, endovascular surgery and surgical techniques. 

Partial list of publications:

Endovascular repair of a traumatic arteriovenous fistula 34 years after the injury: report of a case. Donald T Baril, Paula I Denoya, Sharif H Ellozy, Alfio Carroccio, Michael L Marin, Surgery Today. 2007 ;37(1):78-81 17186353 (P,S,E,B,D) 
Endovascular Stent-Graft Repair of Failed Endovascular Abdominal Aortic Aneurysm Repair. Donald T Baril, Daniel Silverberg, Sharif H Ellozy, Alfio Carroccio, Tikva S Jacobs, Ulka Sachdev, Victoria J Teodorescu, Robert A Lookstein, Michael L Marin, Ann Vasc Surg. 2007 Dec 14; : 18083340 (P,S,E,B,D) 
Endovascular abdominal aortic aneurysm repair: emerging developments and anesthetic considerations. Donald T Baril, Ronald A Kahn, Sharif H Ellozy, Alfio Carroccio, Michael L Marin, J Cardiothorac Vasc Anesth. 2007 Oct ;21(5):730-42 17905287 (P,S,E,B,D)  
Safety and Efficacy of High Dose Adenosine–induced A Systole During Endovascular AAA Repair. Khan RA, Moskowitz DM, Marin ML, Hollier LH, Parsons R, Teodorescu V, McLaughlin MA, J Endovasc Ther. 2000; 7:292-296.  
Management of aneurysms involving branches of the celiac and superior mesenteric arteries: A comparison of surgical and endovascular therapy. Ulka Sachdev, Donald T Baril, Sharif H Ellozy, Robert A Lookstein, Daniel Silverberg, Tikva S Jacobs, Alfio Carroccio, Victoria J Teodorescu, Michael L Marin, J Vasc Surg. 2006 Oct ;44(4):718-24 17011997 (P,S,E,B,D) 
An 8-year experience with type II endoleaks: Natural history suggests selective intervention is a safe approach. Daniel Silverberg, Donald T Baril, Sharif H Ellozy, Alfio Carroccio, Savannah E Greyrose, Robert A Lookstein, Michael L Marin, J Vasc Surg. 2006 Sep;44 (3):453-459 16950415 (P,S,E,B) 
Evolving strategies for the treatment of aortoenteric fistulas. Donald T Baril, Alfio Carroccio, Sharif H Ellozy, Eugene Palchik, Ulka Sachdev, Tikva S Jacobs, Michael L Marin, J Vasc Surg. 2006 Aug ; 44(2):250-7 16890849 (P,S,E,B) 
Experience with endovascular abdominal aortic aneurysm repair in nonagenarians. Donald T Baril, Eugene Palchik, Alfio Carroccio, Jeffrey W Olin, Sharif H Ellozy, Tikva S Jacobs, Marc M Ponzio, Victoria J Teodorescu, Michael L Marin, J Endovasc Ther. ;13 (3):330-7 16784320 (P,S,E,B) 
Branched endografts for treatment of complex aortic aneurysms. Donald T Baril, Sharif H Ellozy, Alfio Carroccio, Michael L Marin, Surg Technol Int. 2005 ;14 :245-52 16525980 (P,S,E,B) 
Endovascular repair of abdominal aortic aneurysms. Daniel Silverberg, Donald T Baril, Jacob Schneiderman, Sharif H Ellozy, Alfio Carroccio, Victoria Teodorescu, Michael L Marin, Harefuah. 2006 Feb;145(2):127-30, 165 16509418 (P,S,E,B) 
Endovascular therapy for aortic disease. Michael D Addis, Donald T Baril, Sharif H Ellozy, Tikva Jakobs, Alfio Carroccio, Victoria Teodorescu, Michael L Marin, Surg Technol Int. 2004; 13:221-6 15744694 (P,S,E,B) 
Endovascular repair of an infected carotid artery pseudoaneurysm. Donald T Baril, Sharif H Ellozy, Alfio Carroccio, Aman B Patel, Robert A Lookstein, Michael L Marin, J Vasc Surg. 2004 Nov;40(5):1024-7 15557920 (P,S,E,B)

References

External links
Video: Dr. Marin discusses minimally invasive surgery
Mount Sinai Hospital homepage
Mount Sinai School of Medicine homepage

1956 births
Living people
American medical academics
American vascular surgeons
Icahn School of Medicine at Mount Sinai faculty
Fellows of the American College of Surgeons